Embers is a 1959 radio play by Samuel Beckett.

Embers may also refer to:

 Embers, the plural of ember

Music
 The Embers (Tasmanian band)
 Will Stoker and the Embers
 The Embers (El Paso band), a band headed by Jim Reese
 Embers (Californian band), a heavy metal band
 Embers, an album by Helen Jane Long
 Embers (album), an album by Nadia Ali

Songs
 "Embers", a track by Mike Oldfield from the 1999 album Guitars
 "Embers" (Just Jack song), 2009 song by Just Jack
 "Embers", a 2010 song by Ash
 "Embers", a 2005 song by Blue Foundation
 "Embers", a song by Kid Cudi from Speedin' Bullet 2 Heaven
 "Embers", a 2015 single by Lamb of God from VII: Sturm und Drang
 "Embers", a 2012 song by Owl City from The Midsummer Station
 "Embers" (James Newman song), a 2021 single by James Newman in the Eurovision Song Contest 2021

Other uses
 Embers (1916 film), a 1916 silent film
 Embers (1983 film), a drama film by Thomas Koerfer 
 Embers (2015 film), a science fiction film by Claire Carré
 The Embers (nightclub), New York City
 Embers (novel), a 1942 novel by Sándor Márai
 Daniel Embers (born 1981), German football footballer and coach
 "Embers", a nickname for Andrew Embley (born 1981), Australian rules footballer

See also
 
 Ember (disambiguation)